Schoenocephalium teretifolium or Summertime Inírida flower (from the Spanish: Flor de Inírida de verano) is a monocot which is an endemic plant in the area between the Colombian rivers of Guainia and Inírida.  Guacamaya superba, another plant in the Rapateaceae family, is also endemic to this region.

References

 Humboldt - Inirida flower
Species account Global biodiversity information network.

Rapateaceae
Endemic flora of Colombia
Taxa named by Bassett Maguire